The Drudenhaus (also known as Malefizhaus, Trudenhaus, Hexenhaus, and Hexengefängnis)  was a famous special prison for people accused during the Bamberg witch trials. The prison was constructed in 1627 on the order of Johann Georg Fuchs von Dornheim, Prince Bishop of Bamberg, and closed in 1632.

History
The Bamberg Drudenhaus was not unique: smaller Drudenhäuser of the same kind were built also in Zeil am Main, Hallstadt and Kronach, but it was the biggest and most famous. The prison was constructed during the Bamberg witch trials, which began in 1626, and the Drudenhaus was used through the duration of the witch trials, which lasted until the closure of the prison.

The building contained 26 single cells, as well as two larger cells for groups of people. An inscription on the portal read: Discite justitiam moniti ET NON TEMNERE Divos (from Vergil's Aeneid: "Let it be a reminder of justice from which the gods cannot ignore"). Walls on the inside of the building were decorated with text from the Bible. People were placed in the Drudenhaus under the accusation of witchcraft and remained until their verdict. Torture was used inside the premises. In April 1631, 20 people were kept in the prison. During this time, about 300 people from the city of Bamberg and about 900 from the area were executed during the ongoing Bamberg witch trials, among them Johannes Junius, Georg Haan and Dorothea Flock.

On 11 February 1632, when the Swedish army marched toward Bamberg to take the city during the Thirty Years' War, officials closed the prison and released the prisoners of the Drudenhaus on condition that they agreed to keep silent about the torture inflicted upon them during their imprisonment.

The building itself was torn down in 1635.

References

 Britta Gehm: Die Hexenverfolgung im Hochstift Bamberg und das Eingreifen des Reichshofrates zu ihrer Beendigung. Olms, 2. überarbeitete Auflage, Hildesheim 2011.  (Dissertation Universität Jena 1999).

1627 establishments in Europe
1632 disestablishments
Prisons in Germany
17th century in the Holy Roman Empire
Bamberg
Demolished buildings and structures in Germany
Buildings and structures demolished in the 17th century
Bamberg witch trials